The number 126 is a bus route that operates between Wells and Axbridge. Under its previous operator, First West of England, the route was branded as Mendip Xplorer.

History 
In April 2021, a two-hourly Sunday and public holiday service was introduced for the summer months.

In April 2022, the route was revised to terminate at the new bus interchange in Weston-super-Mare instead of terminating at the sea front on Marine Parade. The frequency on Saturdays was increased from two-hourly to hourly. In July 2022, the Sunday service was reinstated.

In early August 2022, First West of England announced that it would withdraw the route along with routes X2 and X5. Petitions against the withdrawal were launched by Conservative MP James Heappey and the Wells Liberal Democrats. In September 2022, Somerset County Council announced that it would fund the service between Axbridge and Wells and that the route would be taken over by Libra Travel from 10 October.

Route 
Leaving Wells, the route travels along the A371 road through Easton, Westbury-sub-Mendip, Rodney Stoke, Draycott and Cheddar before ending in the town of Axbridge.

References 

Bus routes in England
Transport in Somerset